Leonard Saxe (born June 12, 1947) is an American social psychologist whose work focuses on sociology of religion, American Jews and the American Jewish community. He is currently the director of the Cohen Center for Modern Jewish Studies at Brandeis University.

Sociological research
Saxe has conducted a number of studies on the American Jewish community. Saxe's research points to a more positive outlook on concerns of the American Jewish community. His figures show larger than previously reported estimates of the population size of American Jewry.

2010 Census of American Jews
In 2010, Saxe, along with sociologists Elizabeth Tighe and Charles Kadushin published their secondary data findings from local Jewish community studies. Their findings were intended to act as a census of American Jews, as the National Jewish Population Survey had been cancelled due to budget constraints.

Birthright-Taglit studies
Saxe has conducted a number of studies on the effect of the Birthright-Taglit program on young American Jews.

Awards
In 2012, Saxe was the recipient of the ASSJ's Marshall Sklare Award for his contributions to the social scientific study of contemporary Jewry.

See also
Brandeis University
Berman Jewish Policy Archive

References

External links
Brandeis University faculty page
Berman Jewish Policy Archive author publication page

1940s births
Living people
University of Pittsburgh alumni
Jewish American scientists
Social psychologists
American sociologists
Jewish sociologists
Jewish social scientists
21st-century American Jews